Cruls is an impact crater in the Eridania quadrangle on Mars at 42.91° S and 163.03° E. and is 87.89 km in diameter. Its name was assigned in 1973 by the International Astronomical Union, in honor of Brazilian astronomer Luís Cruls. Evidence of previous glacial activity is evident in images.

Glacial Features

Glaciers, loosely defined as patches of currently or recently flowing ice, are thought to be present across large but restricted areas of the modern Martian surface, and are inferred to have been more widely distributed at times in the past.

See also 
 List of craters on Mars

References 

Impact craters on Mars
Eridania quadrangle